Talking About Jacqueline (German: Man spricht über Jacqueline) is a 1937 German drama film directed by Werner Hochbaum and starring Wera Engels, Albrecht Schoenhals and Sabine Peters. It was shot at the Johannisthal Studios in Berlin The film's sets were designed by Alfred Bütow, Willi Herrmann and Hermann Warm. It was based on a 1926 novel by Katrin Holland which was later made into a 1942 British film Talk About Jacqueline.

Synopsis
Two sisters compete for the affections of the same man.

Cast
 Wera Engels as Jacqueline Topelius  
 Albrecht Schoenhals as Michael Thomas  
 Sabine Peters as June Topelius  
 Hans Zesch-Ballot as Leslie Waddington  
 Fritz Genschow as Lionel Clark  
 Friedl Haerun as Gloria Watson 
 Edith Meinhard as Ellen  
 Bruno Ziener as William 
 Franz Arzdorf as Wahrsager  
 Eduard Bornträger as Konservatoriumsdiener  
 Fred Goebel as Sekretär  
 Charlie Kracker 
 Hermann Pfeiffer as Jean  
 Ewald Wenck as Würstchenverkäufer  
 Buschhagen as Rennfahrer  
 Ehmer as Rennfahrer  
 Lili Schoenborn-Anspach as Portiersfrau  
 Paul Mederow as Musikprofessor 
 Rosi Rauch as Singer

References

Bibliography 
 Bock, Hans-Michael & Bergfelder, Tim. The Concise Cinegraph: Encyclopaedia of German Cinema. Berghahn Books, 2009.
 Heins, Laura. Nazi Film Melodrama. University of Illinois Press, 2013.

External links 
 

1937 films
1937 drama films
Films of Nazi Germany
German drama films
1930s German-language films
Films directed by Werner Hochbaum
German black-and-white films
1930s German films
Films shot at Johannisthal Studios